Samuel James Meltzer (March 22, 1851 – November 7, 1920) was an American physiologist.

Samuel Meltzer was educated at the University of Königsberg and then studied philosophy and medicine at the University of Berlin where he gained his MD in 1882. The next year, he and his teacher Hugo Kronecker were among the first to study (in 1883) esophageal manometry in humans. 

In the United States, where he practiced his profession in New York City, he went on to serve as consulting physician to Harlem Hospital. In 1906 he was appointed head of the department of physiology and pharmacology at the Rockefeller Institute for Medical Research. He also served as president of the Harvey Society, of the Association for the Advancement of Clinical Research in 1909, and of the Association of American Physiologists in 1915. During World War I, Meltzer was a major in the Medical Reserve Corps, and when the American Association for Thoracic Surgery was organized in 1918 he was elected president. Meltzer was occupied in research in various fields almost to the time of his death.

References

External links
 
 National Academy of Sciences Biographical Memoir

1851 births
1920 deaths
American physiologists
Jewish American scientists
NYU Violets men's basketball coaches
Humboldt University of Berlin alumni
University of Königsberg alumni
Scientists from New York City